Pisgah, Texas, is a ghost town that was located in Navarro County, Texas, about 12 miles south of Corsicana.

History
The area of Pisgah was first settled in the late 1840s.  The Pisgah post office was established in 1891, but closed the following year.  By 1900, the town included a school, a church, and several shops and industries.  The school was merged into the Richland school following World War II.  Except for the cemetery and a few houses, Pisgah had largely disappeared by the mid-1960s.<ref name="THB">[https://tshaonline.org/handbook/online/articles/hrpkg Texas Handbook Online]; website; "Pisgah, TX (Navarro County)"; accessed July 2016.</ref>

John Wesley Hardin, the outlaw, taught school there for a short time in the 1860s while on the run from the law. He claimed while there he shot a man's eye out just to win a bottle of whiskey in a bet.  Hardin also wrote that his cousin, "Simp" Dixon, and he encountered a group of soldiers in the area, and each killed one before they fled the area.

References

Further readingPutnam, Wyvonne'''; comp.; Navarro County History'' (in 5 volumes); Quanah, Texas; Nortex; 1975–84

Ghost towns in Central Texas
Unincorporated communities in Navarro County, Texas
Unincorporated communities in Texas